Bárboles is a municipality located in the province of Zaragoza, Aragon, Spain. According to the 2004 census (INE), the municipality has a population of 318 inhabitants.

Geography
Bárboles is located 32 kilometers from Zaragoza on the banks of the Jalón river.

References 

Municipalities in the Province of Zaragoza